National Route 330 is a national highway of Japan connecting Okinawa, Okinawa and Naha, Okinawa in Japan, with a total length of 26.1 km (16.22 mi).

References

National highways in Japan
Roads in Okinawa Prefecture